Jhon Steven Mondragón Dosman (born 15 October 1994) is a Colombian footballer. Mainly a right back, he can also play as a central defender or a central midfielder for Minaur Baia Mare. He is currently under contract with Petrolul Ploiești.

Club career

Osasuna
Born in Tuluá, Steven moved from Tuluá to Navarre, Spain aged six years and finished his formation with CA Osasuna's youth setup. On 19 October 2013 he made his debut with the reserves, coming on as a substitute for Marc Nierga in a 3–0 Tercera División home win against CD Pamplona.

On 6 January 2016 Steven scored his first senior goal, netting the first in a 4–0 away routing of CD Mendi. He was an undisputed starter for the B-side during the campaign which ended in promotion, contributing 34 appearances. In the following season in the third tier, he was almost ever-present again (29 starts) before being promoted to the first team squad.

On 22 April 2017 Steven made his first team – and La Liga – debut, replacing injured Nikola Vujadinović in a 2–2 home draw against Sporting de Gijón. Eight days later he scored his first goal in the category, netting the first in a 2–2 home draw against Deportivo de La Coruña, and found the net again in his next appearance against Granada C.F., opening the scoring in a 2–1 victory. Nevertheless, at the season's end, Osasuna were relegated from the top division and Steven's contract was not renewed.

Puebla
After some weeks without a club, in September 2017 Steven signed for Liga MX team Club Puebla.

Honours
CA Osasuna B
Tercera División: 2015–16

Minaur Baia Mare
Liga III: 2021–22

References

External links

1994 births
Living people
Footballers from Cali
Colombian footballers
Footballers from Navarre
People from Estella Oriental
Association football defenders
Association football midfielders
Association football utility players
La Liga players
Segunda División B players
Tercera División players
CD Izarra footballers
CA Osasuna B players
CA Osasuna players
Club Puebla players
Leones F.C. footballers
Sport Boys footballers
FC Petrolul Ploiești players
FC Gloria Buzău players
CS Minaur Baia Mare (football) players
Liga MX players
Categoría Primera A players
Peruvian Primera División players
Liga II players
Liga III players
Colombian expatriate footballers
Colombian expatriate sportspeople in Spain
Expatriate footballers in Spain
Colombian expatriate sportspeople in Mexico
Expatriate footballers in Mexico
Colombian expatriate sportspeople in Peru
Expatriate footballers in Peru
Colombian expatriate sportspeople in Romania
Expatriate footballers in Romania